The third season of Dance Moms, an American dance reality TV program created by Collins Avenue Productions, began airing on January 1, 2013 on Lifetime television network. The season concluded on September 17, 2013. A total of 39 official episodes and 1 special episode (The Smoke Before the Fire) aired this season.

Overview
The third season continues after the team's win at nationals. Kelly and her daughters Brooke and Paige decide not to return to the Abby Lee Dance Company. The mothers stage a protest to get Kelly to return, leading Abby to completely create a new competition team. The old team, including Kelly, Brooke, and Paige, eventually reunites and becomes Abby's competition team again. This season introduces many new dance moms and dancers to both the Abby Lee Dance Company and Candy Apples Dance Center.

Cast
The third season featured fourteen star billing cast members with various other dancers and moms appearing throughout the season.

Dancers
 Maddie Ziegler
 Mackenzie Ziegler
 Chloe Lukasiak
 Nia Frazier
 Kendall Vertes
 Asia Monet Ray (Episodes 14-38)
 Brooke Hyland
 Paige Hyland
 Ally Morgan Serigne
 Sophia Luica (episodes 2-4 and 8)

Moms
 Melissa Gisoni
 Christi Lukasiak
 Kelly Hyland
 Holly Hatcher-Frazier
 Jill Vertes
 Kristie Ray (Episodes 14-38)

Guest dancers
 Ally Serigne, a lyrical/contemporary dancer from Ponchatoula, Louisiana. She first appeared in "The Beginning of the End", and was later invited to the ALDC to be part of the "replacement" team, which was formed after the elite team protested against Abby. Ally and her mother eventually left the ALDC after Bella's and Kaeli's mothers (Marcia and Gloria, respectively) blamed Ally for ruining the group dance "Cry". She also had a minor cameo in "The Big, Not So, Easy", as she was in the National group dance.
 Bella Hoffheins, a lyrical/contemporary dancer from Leesburg, Virginia. She was invited to the ALDC to be part of the "replacement" team. Along with Kaeli, Bella was kicked out of the ALDC by Abby due to the accusations their mothers made towards Ally. She makes an appearance in "Revenge of the Replacements" when she and Kaeli competed against the ALDC at a competition in Woodbridge, Virginia with their home studio, Studio Bleu Dance Center. 
 Kaeli Ware, a lyrical/contemporary dancer from Leesburg. She was invited to the ALDC to be part of the "replacement" team. Along with Bella, Kaeli was kicked out of the ALDC by Abby due to the accusations their mothers made towards Ally. She makes an appearance in "Revenge of the Replacements" later when she and Bella competed against the ALDC with Studio Bleu. 
 Sophia Lucia, a jazz/lyrical dancer from San Diego, California. She was invited to the ALDC to be part of the "replacement" team. After the disbandment of the replacement team, Sophia featured on the elite team for a few episodes before finally departing the show in the episode "Rotten to the Core". 
 Payton Ackerman

Guest Moms
 Cathy Nesbitt-Stein (Candy Apples)
 Leslie Ackerman
 Shelly Serigne, mother of Ally. She first appeared in "The Beginning of the End". Shelly later appeared in "Out With the Old, In With the New" with the replacement team. She lastly appeared in "But I'm a National Champion!", by voice only, saying that due to Gloria and Marcia accusing Ally of ruining the group dance, she and her daughter went home to Louisiana. Shelly also had a minor cameo in "The Big, Not So, Easy", as Ally was in the group dance. 
 Marcia Hoffheins, mother of Bella. Along with Bella, she was kicked out by Abby in "But I'm a National Champion!" when she and Gloria accused Ally of ruining the group dance "Cry". They later returned as members of Studio Bleu in "Revenge of the Replacements", competing against ALDC. 
 Gloria Hampton, mother of Kaeli. She and Kaeli were kicked out by Abby after she and Marcia made accusations towards Ally. They later returned as members of Studio Bleu in "Revenge of the Replacements", competing against ALDC. 
 Jackie Lucia, mother of Sophia. She and her daughter were a part of Abby's replacement team in "Out With the Old, In With the New." When the original team was put back into commission in "But I'm a National Champion!", Jackie and Sophia remained on the elite team until departing the show in "Rotten to the Core".

Cast duration

Notes
 Key:  = featured in this episode
 Key:  = not featured in this episode
 Key:  = joins the Abby Lee Dance Company
 Key:  = leaves the Abby Lee Dance Company
 Key:  = returns to the Abby Lee Dance Company

Episodes

References

General references 
 
 
 

2013 American television seasons